Heterohyus is an extinct genus of apatemyid from the early to late Eocene. A small, tree-dwelling creature with elongated fore- and middle fingers, in these regards it somewhat resembled a modern-day aye-aye.

Three skeletons have been found at the early Eocene site at Messel Pit, Germany

References

Bibliography 

 McKenna, Malcolm C., and Bell, Susan K. 1997. Classification of Mammals Above the Species Level. Columbia University Press, New York, 631 pp. 
 Morlo, Michael et al. An annotated taxonomic list of the Middle Eocene (MP11) Vertebratae of Messel gives as author: Teilhard de Chardin, 1921 - please refer to footnote 88.
 Kenneth David Rose. The Beginning of the Age of Mammals. JHU Press, 2006, 428 pp. gives as author: Koenigswald, 1990
 Schaal, Stephan, & Ziegler, Willi (eds) 1992. Messel. An insight into the history of life on Earth. Clarendon Press, Oxford. .

External links 

Prehistoric placental genera
Eocene mammals
Eocene mammals of Europe
Paleogene France
Fossils of France
Quercy Phosphorites Formation
Fossil taxa described in 1848